Sore throat is pain or irritation of the throat.

Sore Throat may also refer to:

 Sore Throat (punk/new wave band), a British band active from 1975–1981
 Sore Throat (grindcore band), a British band active from 1987–1990